The Kernel-Mode Driver Framework (KMDF) is a driver framework developed by Microsoft as a tool to aid driver developers create and maintain kernel mode device drivers for Windows 2000 and later releases.  It is one of the frameworks included in the Windows Driver Frameworks. The current version is 1.27.

Relationship to WDM 
In general, KMDF supports drivers that were written for the Windows Driver Model, and it runs on WDM.  WDM is the driver model used since the advent of Windows 98, whereas KMDF is the driver framework Microsoft advocates and uses for Windows 2000 and beyond.

In general, since more features like power management and plug and play are handled by the KMDF framework, a KMDF driver is less complicated and has less code than an equivalent WDM driver.

KMDF is object-based and built on top of WDM. It provides an object-based perspective to WDM, following the architectural mandate of its superset, WDF. The functionality is contained in different types of objects. KMDF implementation consists of: 
 plug and play and power management
 I/O queues
 Direct memory access (DMA)
 Windows Management Instrumentation (WMI)
 Synchronization

See also 
Windows Driver Frameworks (WDF)
User-Mode Driver Framework (UMDF)

Notes

References

External links 
Windows Driver Kit
Kernel-Mode Driver Framework Homepage
Microsoft KMDF Paper

Device drivers
Free and open-source software
Microsoft application programming interfaces
Microsoft free software
Software using the MIT license
Windows-only free software